Maaden is a village and rural commune in Mauritania. Administratively, the oasis of Mhaïreth is part of Maaden.

Communes of Mauritania